The  is an art museum in Morioka, Japan. It was opened in 2001.

The museum has a permanent exhibition of works by local Iwate Prefecture artists Tetsugoro Yorozu, Shunsuke Matsumoto and Yasutake Funakoshi, and houses temporary exhibitions on both Japanese and foreign themes.

References

External links 

 Official website  in English

Art museums and galleries in Japan
Museums in Iwate Prefecture
Art museums established in 2001
2001 establishments in Japan
Prefectural museums
Morioka, Iwate